Gastón Nelson Iturrieta (born 25 May 1985) is an Argentine professional footballer who plays as a midfielder. He is currently a free agent.

Career
Iturrieta started with Nueva Chicago, before subsequently moving onto Platense, La Florida and San Martín; he made one appearance in Torneo Argentino A for the latter. A move to San Jorge came in 2013, Iturrieta subsequently scored one goal in sixteen appearances for the club in two Torneo Federal A campaigns. Iturrieta joined Primera B Nacional side Atlético Tucumán in 2015 and made his professional debut on 14 November in a league match with Boca Unidos. He departed the club in late-2017.

Career statistics
.

Honours
Atlético Tucumán
Primera B Nacional: 2015

References

External links

1985 births
Living people
Footballers from Buenos Aires
Argentine footballers
Association football midfielders
Torneo Argentino A players
Torneo Federal A players
Primera Nacional players
Argentine Primera División players
Nueva Chicago footballers
Club Atlético Platense footballers
Club Social y Deportivo La Florida players
San Martín de Tucumán footballers
San Jorge de Tucumán footballers
Atlético Tucumán footballers